Dresden Bischofsplatz station is a railway station in the town of Dresden, Saxony, Germany. The station is located on the Pirna–Coswig railway.

Gallery

References

External links
 

Bischofsplatz
Railway stations in Germany opened in 2016
DresdenBischofsplatz